Jon Gott (born October 2, 1985) is a former Canadian football offensive lineman. He was drafted by the Calgary Stampeders in the fifth round of the 2008 CFL Draft. He played five seasons for the Stampeders before being traded to the RedBlacks for the rights to Marwan Hage and the first overall pick in the 2014 CFL Draft. He played college football for the Boise State Broncos.

In the Redblacks' 2018 regular season finale against the Toronto Argonauts, Gott chugged a beer in the endzone as a touchdown celebration. Video of the celebration was widely circulated within Canadian and American social media. Despite the stunt, Gott did not face any disciplinary action from the league.

References

External links
Ottawa Redblacks bio 

1985 births
Living people
Boise State Broncos football players
Calgary Stampeders players
Canadian football offensive linemen
Ottawa Redblacks players
Players of Canadian football from Alberta
Canadian football people from Edmonton